The 2016 United States presidential primaries can refer to:

2016 Democratic Party presidential primaries
2016 Green Party presidential primaries
2016 Libertarian Party presidential primaries
2016 Republican Party presidential primaries